The minister of natural resources is the minister of the Crown in the Canadian Cabinet who is responsible for Natural Resources Canada (NRCan).

In addition to NRCan, the minister oversees the federal government's natural resources portfolio, which includes Atomic Energy of Canada Limited, the Canada Energy Regulator, and the Canadian Nuclear Safety Commission, as well as the Canada-Newfoundland and Labrador Offshore and the Canada-Nova Scotia Offshore Petroleum Boards. The Energy Supplies Allocation Board and the Northern Pipeline Agency also report to the Minister as required.

The current minister of natural resources is Jonathan Wilkinson, since October 26, 2021. This position was established in 1995 under the Department of Natural Resources Act, S.C. 1994, c. 41, which merged the positions of the minister of energy, mines and resources and minister of forestry.

History 
Prior to 1995, the responsibilities of the current natural resources portfolio were divided between the minister of energy, mines and resources and the minister of forestry, both posts which are now defunct.

With the transfer of the Canadian Forest Service from the Department of Forestry to the Department of Agriculture, the forestry portfolio came under the minister of agriculture between 1984 and 1985, then back to the minister of the environment from 1985. It became a single department in 1989 and then designated to the minister of energy, mines and resources in 1990.

In 1994, the Department of Natural Resources Act, S.C. 1994, c. 41, provided for the creation of the minister of natural resources, with authority to carry out matters previously undertaken by the minister of forestry and the minister of energy, mines and resources.

Minister of Energy, Mines and Resources 
The minister of energy, mines, and resources was a member of the Cabinet from 1966 to 1995.

Prior to 1966, the responsibility related to Canadian mines and natural resources resided in various ministers:

 Minister of the Interior (1873–1936)
 Minister of Mines (1907–36)
 Minister of Mines and Resources (1936–50)
 Minister of Resources and Development (1950–53)
 Minister of Mines and Technical Surveys (1950–66)
 Minister of Northern Affairs and National Resources (1953–62)

The emerging role of energy development in federal policy would become more prominent in 1966, when that responsibility was adopted by the natural resources portfolio, whereupon the minister of mines and technical surveys was abolished and the minister of energy, mines and resources was established in its place by Statute 14-15 Eliz. II, c. 25—which received royal assent on 16 June 1966 and proclaimed in-force on October 1 later that year.

Three decades later, in 1995, the energy, mines and resources portfolio merged with that of forestry to form the current minister of natural resources, under the Department of Natural Resources Act, S.C. 1994, c. 41—which received royal assent on December 15, 1994.

Minister of Forestry 
The minister of forestry was an office in the Cabinet from 1962 to 1966 and again from 1990 to 1995. Between 1966 and 1990, it was known as the minister of forestry and rural development.

Prior to 1962, the responsibility for forestry resided in various ministers:

 Minister of the Interior (1873–1936)
 Minister of Mines and Resources (1936–50)
 Minister of Resources and Development (1950–53)
 Minister of Northern Affairs and National Resources (1953–62)

The position of minister of forestry was first created in 1962 by Prime Minister John Diefenbaker and lasted into the government of Lester B. Pearson.

In 1971, responsibility for forestry along with fisheries merged into the minister of the environment, briefly renamed as minister of fisheries and the environment from 1976–79, minister of state (environment) from 1977–79, then back to the minister of the environment from 1979–84.

In 1989, the second incarnation of the Department of Forestry was established under the Department of Forestry Act (assented to 21 December 1989). In 1995, the forestry portfolio was merged with that of the minister of energy, mines and resources to create the post of minister of natural resources.

List of ministers 

Key:

See also

 Natural Resources Canada
 List of forestry ministries

References

Natural Resources
Natural Resources Canada
Canada, Natural Resources
Canada, Natural Resources
Canada, Natural Resources
Canada, Natural Resources